Hilda Smith (30 September 1909 – 22 January 1995) was a British gymnast. She won a bronze medal in the women's team event at the 1928 Summer Olympics.

References

External links
 

1909 births
1995 deaths
British female artistic gymnasts
Olympic gymnasts of Great Britain
Gymnasts at the 1928 Summer Olympics
Olympic bronze medallists for Great Britain
Olympic medalists in gymnastics
Medalists at the 1928 Summer Olympics
Sportspeople from Leigh, Greater Manchester